Machine Gun in the Clown's Hand is the eighth spoken word album by Jello Biafra. Topics covered in the album include the War on Terrorism, California's energy crisis, and voting problems in Florida. Biafra originally titled the album Osama McDonald (a combination of the names of Osama bin Laden and Ronald McDonald), a name which he was later credited by on the album Never Breathe What You Can't See, which was recorded with The Melvins.

Track listing
Disc 1

Disc 2

Disc 3

Personnel
Jello Biafra - Producer, concept, insert
Josh Baker - Art producer, construction
Matt Kelley - Editing
Christopher Shaw - Insert
Winston Smith - Insert
Chuck Sperry - Cover art
John Yates - Artwork

References

2002 albums
Alternative Tentacles albums
Jello Biafra albums
Spoken word albums by American artists